Ferdinand Bracke (born 25 May 1939) is a Belgian former professional road and track cyclist who is most famous for holding the World Hour Record (48.093 km) and winning the overall title at the 1971 Vuelta a España in front of Wilfried David of Belgium and Luis Ocaña of Spain. He also became world pursuit champion on the track in 1964 and 1969.

Biography
Bracke was born in Hamme, East Flanders, Belgium, on 24 May 1939. A rouleur and time trialist, he emerged as an amateur in 1962 by winning the tenth stage of the Peace Race. In May of the same year he won the Grand Prix des Nations, a time trial race. He turned pro on 26 September 1962, joining the Peugeot-BP-Dunlop team headed by Gaston Plaud.

In the following years he obtained numerous prestigious victories on road: he won the Trofeo Baracchi, together with Eddy Merckx, in 1966 and 1967, a stage in the 1966 Tour de France and the final time trial of the 1976 Tour de France. He finished in third place in the general classification at the 1968 Tour de France. In 1971 he won the Vuelta a España, beating compatriot Wilfried David (who placed second) and Spaniard Luis Ocaña (who placed third).

He became world champion in track pursuit in 1964 in Paris and again in Antwerp in 1969, then winning second place in 1972 and 1974 and placing third in 1973. On 30 October 1967 he recorded the hour record with 48,093 kilometers at the Olympic Velodrome in Rome, becoming the first cyclist to reach the milestone of 48 kilometers. The record, broken the following year by Ole Ritter, remained the best performance on track below 600 meters of altitude for a long time.

In 1978 he ended his cycling career and took over a furniture business with his wife. On 17 February 1979, Bracke was bid farewell to cycling at a cycling gala in the Sports Palace in Ghent.

Honours
In 1967 Bracke was voted Belgian Sportsman of the Year (the first in history to receive this award) and was awarded the Belgian Sports Merit Award.

Major results

Road

1961
 1st Overall Tour of Austria amateurs
 1st Stages 1 & 2a (TTT) Etoile Hennuyère
 1st Stage 2 Ronde van Limburg amateurs
 1st Stage 2b (ITT)Tour de Wallonie
1962
 1st Grand Prix des Nations (ITT)
 1st Stage 10 Peace Race
 2nd Grand Prix du Parisien
 3rd Gran Premio di Lugano
1963
1st Grand Prix du Parisien
2nd Flèche Hesbignonne
2nd Manche-Océan
2nd Grand Prix des Nations
 2nd Gran Premio di Lugano
3rd Trofeo Baracchi (with Walter Boucquet)
1964
 1st Stage 2b Tour du Sud-Est
 1st Stage 5b (TTT) Four Days of Dunkirk
 1st Stage 4 Grand Prix du Midi Libre
 1st Gran Premio di Lugano
2nd Tour de l'Oise
3rd Bruxelles-Verviers
3rd Omloop van West Brabant
1965
1st Tour de Haute-Loire
1st GP de la Basse-Sambre
1966
 1st Trofeo Baracchi (with Eddy Merckx)
 1st Stage 19 Tour de France
1st Stage 1b (ITT) Tour of Belgium
1st Stage 2b (TTT) Four Days of Dunkirk
2nd Escalada a Montjuïc
1967
 1st Trofeo Baracchi (with Eddy Merckx)
 3rd  Interclubs road race, National Road Championships
1968
1st European Time Trial Cup (with Vittorio Adorni)
1st LuK Challenge Chrono (with Vittorio Adorni)
2nd  National Road Championships
2nd Overall Paris-Nice
1st Stage 8b (ITT)
 3rd Overall Tour de France
1969
 1st Stage 2b (ITT) Four Days of Dunkirk
 1st Stage 1c Critérium du Dauphiné
2nd Overall Grand Prix du Midi Libre
 1st Stage 3
1970
1st Grand Prix de Wallonie
 1st Stage 5b (ITT) Four Days of Dunkirk
1971
 1st  Overall Vuelta a España
1st Flèche Hesbignonne
2nd Overall Tour de Luxembourg
3rd Overall Tour of Belgium
1972
1st Stage 5 Étoile des Espoirs
1st Prologue (TTT) Critérium du Dauphiné
3rd Overall Four Days of Dunkirk
1973
 1st Grand Prix Pino Cerami
1974
 1st Grand Prix de Monaco
Tour de Picardie
 1st stage 3
3rd Overall Tour of Belgium
 1st stage 6
 3rd Circuit de la Région Linière
2nd Le Samyn
1975
 3rd GP de Wallonie
1976
 1st Stage 17 Tour de France
1977
1st Bruxelles-Biévène
1978
2nd Bruxelles-Ingooigem
3rd Trofee Luc Van Biesen

Track

1964
 1st  Individual pursuit, UCI World Championships
 3rd  Individual pursuit, National Track Championships
1965
 1st  Individual pursuit, National Track Championships
 2nd  Individual pursuit, UCI World Championships
3rd  Omnium, European Championships
1966
 2nd  Individual pursuit, UCI World Championships
1967
  World Hour Record – 48.093km
 1st  Individual pursuit, National Track Championships
 1st Six Days of Charleroi (with Patrick Sercu)
1968
 1st Six Days of Charleroi (with Eddy Merckx)
 2nd  Omnium, National Track Championships
1969
 1st  Individual pursuit, UCI World Championships
 3rd Six Days of Charleroi (with Rudi Altig)
1970
2nd Six Days of Brussels
3rd  Omnium, National Track Championships
1971
2nd Six Days of Ghent (with Peter Post
 3rd Six Days of Grenoble
 3rd Six Days of Brussels
 3rd  Omnium, National Track Championships
1972
 Belgian National Championships
1st  Individual Pursuit
1st  Derny
 2nd  Individual pursuit, UCI World Championships
1973
 1st  Individual pursuit, National Track Championships
1st Six Days of Montreal (with Robert Van Lancker)
 3rd  Individual pursuit, UCI World Championships
 3rd  Derny, European Championships
1974
 2nd  Individual pursuit, UCI World Championships
2nd  Individual pursuit, National Track Championships
3rd Six Days of Herning (with Julien Stevens)
1975
 Belgian National Championships
2nd  Madison (with Willy Debosscher)
3rd  Derny
1977
3rd  Omnium, National Track Championships
1979
3rd Six Days of Antwerp (with Constant Tourné)

World record info

References

External links 

Official Tour de France results for Ferdinand Bracke

Belgian male cyclists
Belgian Tour de France stage winners
Vuelta a España winners
1939 births
Living people
People from Hamme
UCI Track Cycling World Champions (men)
Cyclists from East Flanders
Belgian track cyclists